Valerie McClain-Ward (born February 14, 1956) is an American rowing coxswain. She competed in the women's coxed four event at the 1984 Summer Olympics.

References

External links
 

1956 births
Living people
American female rowers
Olympic rowers of the United States
Rowers at the 1984 Summer Olympics
Sportspeople from Berkeley, California
Coxswains (rowing)
21st-century American women